Button-scaled gecko (Chondrodactylus laevigatus) is a species of African gecko found in South Africa, Namibia, and Angola.

References

laevigatus
Reptiles of South Africa
Reptiles of Namibia
Reptiles of Angola
Reptiles described in 1888